The 2017 VCU Rams men's soccer team represented Virginia Commonwealth University during the 2017 NCAA Division I men's soccer season. It was the 38th season of the university fielding a program. The Rams were be led by eighth-year head coach, Dave Giffard.

For the third straight season, the Rams reached the championship match of the Atlantic 10 Men's Soccer Tournament, but lost for the third straight time. The Rams fell 1-3 to UMass. Despite the loss the Rams earned an at-large berth to the NCAA Division I Men's Soccer Championship. It was the program's first NCAA Tournament berth in four years. VCU were seeded 16th, giving the program their first seeding since 2012. The Rams lost in their opening NCAA Tournament match to Butler, 2-3.

Background

Previous season 

The Rams team finished the 2016 season 8–9–4, 4–3–1 in A10 play to earn a berth into the 2016 Atlantic 10 Men's Soccer Tournament. They defeated UMass and Dayton to advance to the A10 Championship, where they lost to Fordham. The Rams did not earn an at-large berth into the 2016 NCAA Tournament.

Review

Offseason 
During the 2016-17 offseason, the Rams lost nine seniors to graduation. The most notable departure was four-year starter, Dakota Barnathan, who declared for the 2017 MLS SuperDraft. Barnathan was selected in the third round, with the 59th pick by FC Dallas. Barnathan was offered a trial with FC Dallas, and appeared in a couple preseason exhibitions with the club, but ultimately was not offered a contract. After leaving Dallas' camp, Barnathan signed on with second division, United Soccer League outfit, Swope Park Rangers, the reserve team of MLS-outfit, Sporting Kansas City. No other graduates signed professional contracts following their graduation.

In February 2017, the spring 2017 season schedule was announced, where VCU participated in several exhibition matches between March and May.

On November 13, 2017, VCU was announced as the 16th-overall seed in the 2017 NCAA Division I Men's Soccer Championship, making it the 10th time in program history the Rams qualified for the tournament.

Transfers

Departures

Incoming transfers

Recruits

Roster 

As of November 15, 2017.

Captains in bold

Schedule

|-
!colspan=8 style=""| Spring season

|-
!colspan=8 style=""| Exhibitions
|-

|-
!colspan=8 style=""| Regular season
|-

|-
!colspan=8 style=""| Atlantic 10 Tournament
|-

|-
!colspan=8 style=""| NCAA Tournament
|-

Rankings

National rankings

Regional rankings

Awards

Season statistics

Team

Individual

MLS Draft 
The following members of the 2017 VCU Rams men's soccer team were selected in the 2018 MLS SuperDraft.

References 

VCU Rams men's soccer seasons
VCU Rams
Vcu Rams
VCU Rams
Vcu Rams